The Hundred of Waterhouse is a cadastral hundred of the County of Robe, South Australia, established in 1846.

The hundred is located on the south-east coast near Lake Hawdon and the port of Robe.

References

Waterhouse